"Where Do We Go from Here" is a song by American rock band Filter for their third studio album, The Amalgamut. The song was released as the album's first single in 2002. "Where Do We Go from Here" failed to match the success of their earlier hit single, 1999's "Take a Picture" on the Billboard Hot 100. However, it managed to come close to the top ten of the Hot Mainstream Rock Tracks and Hot Modern Rock Tracks charts at number 12 and number 11, respectively. A popular remix of this song was made by The X-Ecutioners which gained extensive club play.

A music video was also produced for the song. It received moderate airplay upon release.

Like many of the band's singles, the single version of "Where Do We Go from Here" (the one used for radio and the music video) is much shorter than the album version. The album version extends the pre-choruses and bridge mostly.

Chart performance

References

2002 singles
Filter (band) songs
Songs written by Richard Patrick
2002 songs
Warner Records singles
Rock ballads

Alternative metal songs